Live from London EP is the first live EP by rock band Stereophonics. It was released exclusively to the iTunes Store as part of the Live from London series. The band performed at the Apple Store in Regent Street, London to 250 people on 19 April 2005. It was the first time a band had performed there and released songs recorded there.

Track listing

References

External links
 Live from London EP at Stereophonics.com

Stereophonics albums
V2 Records EPs
2005 debut EPs
Live EPs
2005 live albums
ITunes-exclusive releases